The Saleen 302 Series are variations introduced in the 5th generation of Ford Mustang which was produced by the American manufacturer Saleen, Inc. Beginning in 2007 with the S302-PJ edition, Saleen modified stock Ford 4.6L 3V V8 engine blocks with a larger displacement and high compression to 5.0L with OEM engine components.

Previously referred to as Saleen Mustang, Saleen now introduced a model designation based on the Cubic Inch Displacement (CID) of the engine, now referring the car as Saleen 302 CID, or simply S302. Any distinguishable options purchased by the customer is indicated with a suffix added after the 302, designating its difference.

Variants 
From its first introduction in 2007 until 2009, the 302 Series have been introduced in several limited edition models:

S302-PJ: Limited Edition Parnelli Jones Model
H302-3V: Naturally Aspirated 3-Valve Heritage Model
H302-DH: Limited Edition Dark Horse Heritage Model with SpeedLab SuperShaker
H302-SC: Supercharged Heritage Model
S302-E: Supercharged Extreme Model
S302-ST/SA-25: 25th Anniversary Sterling Edition Model (2008)

S302-PJ
Making its debut for the 302 Series, the Ford Saleen 302 CID Parnelli Jones was a limited run of 500 vehicles commemorating Parnelli Jones’ 1970 SCCA Ford Mustang Boss 302.

H302-3V
The H302-3V also uses Shaker Hood Scoop found on the S302-PJ but does not have any chrome trim accents. The H302-3V is available in all OEM Ford colors except Grabber Orange.

H302-DH
Introduced only in 2009, the Heritage 302 CID Dark Horse was a limited run of 30 vehicles. Another interesting feature is the use of a SuperShaker scoop attached to the Series IV Supercharger which integrates the scoop and the supercharger together.

H302-SC
The Heritage 302 CID Supercharged version of the H302-3V now utilizes a Saleen forced-induction system as well as a twin-screw intercooled supercharger to boost horsepower performance at 580 (430 kW). Borrowing only the Watts Link from the S302-PJ, the H302-SC does not use the Shaker Hood Scoop from the S302-PJ due to the Supercharger being in place of the scoop.

S302-E

S302-ST (SA-25)
To celebrate 25 Years of Saleen, 25 specially customized S302’s were built with the latest technology Saleen had to offer at the time. The Saleen 302 CID STerlng Edition, also known as the Saleen Anniversary of 25 Years brought the return of only being offered as a Coupe since the introduction of the SA-10 in 1993 as well as being the only Anniversary model to not have Black, White, or Yellow paint/graphics applied.

See also 
 Ford Mustang
 Shelby Mustang

References 

Saleen Colour Production
Saleen Mustang Production
Saleen Mustang History
Saleen 5.0 Engine Press Release
Saleen S302-E/H302-SC Models
Saleen S302-SI/SA-25 Model
Saleen Parnelli Jones 302
Saleen Dark Horse

External links 
2008 Saleen Vehicle Lineup
Phil Frank Design, LLC website

Rear-wheel-drive vehicles
2000s cars
S-302